Stomatella capieri is a species of sea snail, a marine gastropod mollusk in the family Trochidae, the top snails.

Description
The size of the shell varies between 2.8 mm and 7 mm.

Distribution
This marine species occurs off the Philippines at depths between 60 m and 100 m.

References

External links
 

capieri
Gastropods described in 2006